In the mathematical theory of knots, the stick number is a knot invariant that intuitively gives the smallest number of straight "sticks" stuck end to end needed to form a knot.

Known values
Six is the lowest stick number for any nontrivial knot. There are few knots whose stick number can be determined exactly.

The same result was found independently around the same time by a research group around Colin Adams, but for a smaller range of parameters.

Bounds

The stick number of a knot sum can be upper bounded by the stick numbers of the summands:

Related invariants
The stick number of a knot  is related to its crossing number  by the following inequalities:

These inequalities are both tight for the trefoil knot, which has a crossing number of 3 and a stick number of 6.

References

Notes

Introductory material
. An accessible introduction into the topic, also for readers with little mathematical background.
.

Research articles

External links

"Stick numbers for minimal stick knots", KnotPlot Research and Development Site.

Knot invariants